Malo Mlačevo is a village south of Grosuplje in central Slovenia. The area is part of the historical region of Lower Carniola. The Municipality of Grosuplje is now included in the Central Slovenia Statistical Region.

Name
The name Malo Mlačevo literally means 'little Mlačevo', distinguishing it from the neighboring settlement of Veliko Mlačevo (literally, 'big Mlačevo'). The name was first attested in 1277 as zemlassen (i.e., ze mlassen 'at Mlassen'), and in 1313 as in dem wenigern Maltscher (Mlatschen), and in 1496 as Klein Mlatscherin, among other variations. The name is presumably derived from *Mlačevo selo/polje, ultimately meaning 'village/field belonging to Milač (or Mladič)'. In the past the German name was Kleinmlatschevo.

Cultural heritage
A small roadside chapel-shrine in the settlement was built in the first quarter of the 20th century.

References

External links

Malo Mlačevo on Geopedia

Populated places in the Municipality of Grosuplje